FC Echichens is a Swiss football club, currently in 2nd tier of the Swiss Football League. It plays in Échichens.

Since 2007 they are competing in Group 1 of the 2e League in the "Association cantonale vaudoise de football" region.

The football club was famous for having 7-time World Formula One Champion Michael Schumacher in their squad.

References

External links
 FC Echichens official website
 FC Echichens on the Swiss FA website

Football clubs in Switzerland
1966 establishments in Switzerland
Association football clubs established in 1966